

The Boeing Model 8, a.k.a. BB-L6, was an American biplane aircraft designed by Boeing specifically for their test pilot, Herb Munter.

Development and design
The Model 8 design was inspired by the Ansaldo A.1 Balilla. The fuselage was covered in mahogany plywood, with a two-passenger forward cockpit and pilot rear cockpit, a seating configuration that would be the standard for all following three-seaters. The wing configuration and powerplant were similar to the Boeing Model 7.

The Model 8 first flew  in 1920, and was the first aircraft to fly over Mount Rainier. The aircraft was destroyed in a hangar fire in Kent, Washington in 1923.

Specifications (BB-L6)

References

 Bowers, Peter M. Boeing aircraft since 1916. London: Putnam Aeronautical Books, 1989. .

External links
Boeing Model 8 (BB-L6) (Russian)

1920s United States civil utility aircraft
008, Boeing
Biplanes
Single-engined tractor aircraft
Aircraft first flown in 1920